Acacia deflexa is a shrub of the genus Acacia and the subgenus Plurinerves that is endemic to a small area in south western Australia.

Description
Like most species of Acacia it has phyllodes rather than true leaves. The thick, leathery and evergreen phyllodes are deflexed or patent becoming deflexed and have an elliptic to broadly elliptic or narrowly oblong shape and are straight or slightly curved. It blooms from August to September and produces yellow flowers.

Distribution
It is native to an area in the Wheatbelt region of Western Australia where it is commonly situated on plains growing in gravelly sandy loam and sandy soils often around laterite. The range of the plant extends from around Bendering and Ardath in the north down to around Cuballing and Harrismith in the south as a part of low scrub and heathland communities.

See also
 List of Acacia species

References

deflexa
Acacias of Western Australia
Taxa named by Joseph Maiden
Taxa named by William Blakely
Plants described in 1928